Mattoni is a brand of mineral water from Karlovy Vary in the Czech Republic.

Mattoni may also refer to:

 Mattoni NBL, an alternate name of the Czech Republic National Basketball League
 André Mattoni (1900–1985), Bohemian-Austrian actor
 Virgilio Mattoni (1842-1923), Spanish painter